Ionuţ Bălan (born 2 March 1978 in Bucharest) is a Romanian former football right defender.

Honours
Dinamo București
Cupa României: 2004–05
Unirea Alba Iulia
Divizia B: 2008–09

References

External links

Living people
1978 births
Footballers from Bucharest
Romanian footballers
CS Minaur Baia Mare (football) players
FC Dinamo București players
FCV Farul Constanța players
FC UTA Arad players
CSM Unirea Alba Iulia players
ASC Daco-Getica București players
Liga I players
Liga II players
Romanian expatriate footballers
Expatriate footballers in Hungary
Romanian expatriate sportspeople in Hungary
Association football defenders